Gabrielle George (born 2 February 1997) is an English professional footballer who plays as a defender for Everton.

Club career

Early career
George began playing football with boys at the age of nine. George spent her youth development with Blackpool girls and Manchester United's Centre of Excellence.

Everton
George began her career at Everton in 2014. In April 2014, she made her first team debut against Notts County. George made 14 appearances for the Blues during her first season, including a start in the 2014 FA Women's Cup Final, despite being just 17 years of age. The same year, she was named Player of The FA Women's Cup Sixth Round after helping Everton shut out previous champions Liverpool 2–0. After defeating Notts County 2–1 in the semifinals, Everton lost the final to Arsenal 2–0 in the Final in front of over 15,000 fans.

George made club history in 2017 when she signed a two-year contract as Everton's first full-time professional player.

International career
George has represented England at the U-17, U-19, U-20, and U-21 levels, playing in one U-20 World Cup and two European finals.

In 2017, George earned her first call-up to the senior team for the 2017 SheBelieves Cup in the United States. She made her debut on 4 September 2018 in a 6–0 victory over Kazakhstan in a World Cup qualifier.

Personal life
George's cousin, Jesse Lingard, plays for Nottingham Forest F.C. and England.

Honours 
Everton
 FA WSL 2: 2017
 FA Women's Cup runners-up: 2014

Individual
 North West Rising Star: 2015
 FA Women's Cup Player of the Round: 2014
 WSL Player of the Month: January 2023

References

External links 

 
 FA player profile
 Everton player profile

1997 births
Living people
English women's footballers
Footballers from Manchester
Women's association football defenders
Everton F.C. (women) players
England women's under-23 international footballers
England women's international footballers
England women's under-21 international footballers